Euphalacra is a genus of moths belonging to the subfamily Drepaninae.

Species
 Euphalacra trifenestrata Swinhoe, 1902
 Euphalacra semisecta Warren, 1922
 Euphalacra discipuncta Holloway, 1976
 Euphalacra lacunata Holloway, 1998
 Euphalacra nigridorsata Warren, 1897
 Euphalacra nigridorsoides Holloway, 1998
 Euphalacra postmediangulata Holloway, 1998

References

Drepaninae
Drepanidae genera